Ice cream is a frozen dessert, typically made from milk or cream and flavoured with a sweetener, either sugar or an alternative, and a spice, such as cocoa or vanilla, or with fruit such as strawberries or peaches. It can also be made by whisking a flavored cream base and liquid nitrogen together.  Food coloring is sometimes added, in addition to stabilizers. The mixture is cooled below the freezing point of water and  stirred to incorporate air spaces and to prevent detectable ice crystals from forming. The result is a smooth, semi-solid foam that is solid at very low temperatures (below ). It becomes more malleable as its temperature increases.

The meaning of the name "ice cream" varies from one country to another. In some countries, such as the United States, "ice cream" applies only to a specific variety, and most governments regulate the commercial use of the various terms according to the relative quantities of the main ingredients, notably the amount of cream. Products that do not meet the criteria to be called ice cream are sometimes labelled "frozen dairy dessert" instead. In other countries, such as Italy and Argentina, one word is used for all variants. Analogues made from dairy alternatives, such as goat's or sheep's milk, or milk substitutes (e.g., soy, cashew, coconut, almond milk or tofu), are available for those who are lactose intolerant, allergic to dairy protein or vegan.

Ice cream may be served in dishes, for eating with a spoon, or licked from edible wafer cones. Ice cream may be served with other desserts—such as apple pie, or as an ingredient in ice cream floats, sundaes, milkshakes, ice cream cakes and  baked items, such as Baked Alaska.

History

Early frozen desserts

The origins of frozen desserts are obscure, although several accounts exist about their history.
Some sources describe ice cream-like foods as originating in Persia as far back as 550 BC. Using Ice houses and ice pools, Persians were able to serve and produce faloodeh and sorbets all year round.

A Roman cookbook dating back to the 1st-century includes recipes for sweet desserts that are sprinkled with snow.

There are Persian records from the 2nd-century for sweetened drinks chilled with ice.

There are Tang dynasty records of a chilled dessert made with flour, camphor and water buffalo milk.

Kakigori was a Japanese dessert using ice and flavored syrup. The origins of kakigōri date back the Heian period in Japanese history, when blocks of ice saved during the colder months would be shaved and served with sweet syrup to Japanese aristocracy during the summer. Kakigōri's origin is referred to in The Pillow Book, a book of observations written by Sei Shōnagon, who served the Imperial Court during the Heian period.

The earliest known written process to artificially make ice is known not from culinary texts, but the 13th-century writings of Arab historian Ibn Abi Usaybi'a in his book Kitab Uyun al-anba fi tabaqat-al-atibba (Book of Sources of Information on the Classes of Physicians) concerning medicine in which Ibn Abu Usaybi’a attributes the process to an even older author, Ibn Bakhtawayhi, of whom nothing is known.

Ice cream production became easier with the discovery of the endothermic effect. Prior to this, cream could be chilled easily but not frozen. It was the addition of salt, that lowered the melting point of ice, which had the effect of drawing heat from the cream and allowing it to freeze.

South Asia 

In the sixteenth century, the Mughal Empire used relays of horsemen to bring ice from the Hindu Kush to its capital Delhi. The ice was used in fruit sorbets. It was also used to create kulfi, a popular frozen dairy dessert from the Indian subcontinent often described as "traditional Indian ice cream."

Europe 
The technique of "freezing" is not known from any European sources prior to the 16th century. During the sixteenth century authors made reference to the refrigerant effect that happened when salt was added to ice causing it to freeze. But it wasn't until the latter part of the seventeenth century that sorbets and ice creams were made using this process.

Ice cream's spread throughout Europe is sometimes attributed to Moorish traders, but more often to Marco Polo. Though it's not mentioned in any of his writings, Polo is often credited with introducing sorbet-style desserts to Italy after learning of it during his travels to China. The Italian duchess Catherine de' Medici is said to have introduced flavored sorbet ices to France when she brought some Italian chefs with her to France upon marrying the Duke of Orléans (Henry II of France) in 1533. One hundred years later, Charles I of England was reportedly so impressed by the "frozen snow" that he offered his own ice cream maker a lifetime pension in return for keeping the formula secret, so that ice cream could be a royal prerogative. There is no evidence to support many of these legends.

France 
In 1651, Italian Francesco dei Coltelli opened an ice cream café in Paris, and the product became so popular that during the next 50 years another 250 cafés opened in Paris.

The first recipe in French for flavoured ices appears in 1674, in Nicholas Lemery's Recueil de curiositéz rares et nouvelles de plus admirables effets de la nature. Recipes for sorbetti saw publication in the 1694 edition of Antonio Latini's Lo Scalco alla Moderna (The Modern Steward). Recipes for flavoured ices begin to appear in François Massialot's Nouvelle Instruction pour les Confitures, les Liqueurs, et les Fruits, starting with the 1692 edition. Massialot's recipes result in a coarse, pebbly texture. Latini claims that the results of his recipes should have the fine consistency of sugar and snow.

England 
The first recorded mention of ice cream in England was in 1671. Elias Ashmole described the dishes served at the Feast of St George at Windsor in for Charles II in 1671 and included 'one plate of ice cream'. The only table at the banquet with ice cream on it was that of the King. The first recipe for ice cream in English was published in Mrs. Mary Eales's Receipts, a book dedicated to confectionary, in London in 1718.

To ice cream.

Take Tin Ice-Pots, fill them with any Sort of Cream you like, either plain or sweeten’d, or Fruit in it; shut your Pots very close; to six Pots you must allow eighteen or twenty Pound of Ice, breaking the Ice very small; there will be some great Pieces, which lay at the Bottom and Top: You must have a Pail, and lay some Straw at the Bottom; then lay in your Ice, and put in amongst it a Pound of Bay-Salt; set in your Pots of Cream, and lay Ice and Salt between every Pot, that they may not touch; but the Ice must lie round them on every Side; lay a good deal of Ice on the Top, cover the Pail with Straw, set it in a Cellar where no Sun or Light comes, it will be froze in four Hours, but it may stand longer; then take it out just as you use it; hold it in your Hand and it will slip out. When you wou’d freeze any Sort of Fruit, either Cherries, Raspberries, Currants, or Strawberries, fill your Tin-Pots with the Fruit, but as hollow as you can; put to them Lemmonade, made with Spring-Water and Lemmon-Juice sweeten’d; put enough in the Pots to make the Fruit hang together, and put them in Ice as you do Cream.

From Mrs. Mary Eale's Receipts (1718)

The 1751 edition of The Art of Cookery made Plain and Easy by Hannah Glasse includes a recipe for ice cream: "H. GLASSE Art of Cookery (ed. 4) 333 (heading) To make Ice Cream..set it [sc. the cream] into the larger Bason. Fill it with Ice, and a Handful of Salt."

The year 1768 saw the publication of L'Art de Bien Faire les Glaces d'Office by M. Emy, a cookbook devoted entirely to recipes for flavoured ices and ice cream.

In 1769 Domenico Negri, an Italian confectioner, founded a business in Berkeley Square London which would become famous for its ice creams. His shop was at the Sign of the Pineapple (an emblem used by confectioners) and his trade card said he sold:

'All Sorts of English, French and Italian wet and dry'd Sweet Meats, Cedrati and Bergamot Chips, Naples Diavoloni, All sorts of Baskets & Cakes, fine and Common Sugar plums...' but most importantly '...all Sorts of Ice, Fruits and creams in the best Italian manner.'

In 1789 Frederick Nutt, who served an apprenticeship at Negri's establishment, first published The Complete Confectioner. The book had thirty-one different recipes for ice creams, some with fresh fruit, others with jams, and some using fruit syrups. Flavours included ginger, chocolate, brown breadcrumbs and one flavoured with Parmesan cheese.

North America 

An early North American reference to ice cream is from 1744: "Among the rarities..was some fine ice cream, which, with the strawberries and milk, eat most deliciously." It was served by the lady of Governor Bland.

Quaker colonists introduced ice cream to the United States, bringing their ice cream recipes with them. Confectioners sold ice cream at their shops in New York and other cities during the colonial era. Ben Franklin, George Washington, and Thomas Jefferson were known to have regularly eaten and served ice cream. Records, kept by a merchant from Catham street, New York, show George Washington spending approximately $200 on ice cream in the summer of 1790. The same records show president Thomas Jefferson having an 18-step recipe for ice cream. First Lady Dolley Madison, wife of U.S. President James Madison, served ice cream at her husband's Inaugural Ball in 1813.

Small-scale hand-cranked ice cream freezers were invented in England by Agnes Marshall and in America by Nancy Johnson in the 1840s.

Expansion in popularity 
In the Mediterranean, ice cream appears to have been accessible to ordinary people by the mid-eighteenth century. Ice cream became popular and inexpensive in England in the mid-nineteenth century, when Swiss émigré Carlo Gatti set up the first stand outside Charing Cross station in 1851. He sold scoops in shells for one penny. Prior to this, ice cream was an expensive treat confined to those with access to an ice house. Gatti built an 'ice well' to store ice that he cut from Regent's Canal under a contract with the Regent's Canal Company. By 1860, he expanded the business and began importing ice on a large scale from Norway.

In New Zealand, a newspaper advertisement for ice cream appeared in 1866, claiming to be the first time ice cream was available in Wellington. Commercial manufacturing was underway in 1875. Ice cream rapidly gained in popularity in New Zealand throughout the 20th century. By 2018, exported ice cream products included new flavors such as "matcha" to cater specifically to Asian markets.

Agnes Marshall, regarded as the "queen of ices" in England, did much to popularize ice cream recipes and make its consumption into a fashionable middle-class pursuit. She wrote four books:  The Book of Ices (1885), Mrs. A.B. Marshall's Book of Cookery (1888), Mrs. A.B. Marshall's Larger Cookery Book of Extra Recipes (1891) and Fancy Ices (1894) and gave public lectures on cooking. She even suggested using liquid nitrogen to make ice cream.

Ice cream soda was invented in the 1870s, adding to ice cream's popularity. The invention of this cold treat is attributed to American Robert Green in 1874, although there is no conclusive evidence to prove his claim. The ice cream sundae originated in the late 19th century. Several men claimed to have created the first sundae, but there is no conclusive evidence to support any of their stories. Some sources say that the sundae was invented to circumvent blue laws, which forbade serving sodas on Sunday. Towns claiming to be the birthplace of the sundae include Buffalo, Two Rivers, Ithaca, and Evanston. Both the ice cream cone and banana split became popular in the early 20th century.

The first mention of the cone being used as an edible receptacle for the ice cream is in Mrs. A.B. Marshall's Book of Cookery of 1888. Her recipe for "Cornet with Cream" said that "the cornets were made with almonds and baked in the oven, not pressed between irons". The ice cream cone was popularized in the US at the 1904 World's Fair in St. Louis, Missouri.

The history of ice cream in the 20th century is one of great change and increases in availability and popularity. In the United States in the early 20th century, the ice cream soda was a popular treat at the soda shop, the soda fountain, and the ice cream parlor. During the American Prohibition, the soda fountain to some extent replaced the outlawed alcohol establishments such as bars and saloons.

Ice cream became popular throughout the world in the second half of the 20th century after cheap refrigeration became common. There was an explosion of ice cream stores and of flavours and types. Vendors often competed on the basis of variety: Howard Johnson's restaurants advertised "a world of 28 flavors", and Baskin-Robbins made its 31 flavors ("one for every day of the month") the cornerstone of its marketing strategy (the company now boasts that it has developed over 1000 varieties).

One important development in the 20th century was the introduction of soft ice cream, which has more air mixed in, thereby reducing costs. The soft ice cream machine fills a cone or dish from a spigot. In the United States, chains such as Dairy Queen, Carvel, and Tastee-Freez helped popularize soft-serve ice cream. Baskin-Robbins would later incorporate it into their menu.

Technological innovations such as these have introduced various food additives into ice cream, most notably the stabilizing agent gluten, to which some people have an intolerance. Recent awareness of this issue has prompted a number of manufacturers to start producing gluten-free ice cream.

The 1980s saw thicker ice creams being sold as "premium" and "super-premium" varieties under brands such as Ben & Jerry's, Chocolate Shoppe Ice Cream Company and Häagen-Dazs.

Composition 
Ice cream is a colloidal emulsion made with water, ice, milk fat, milk protein, sugar and air. Water and fat have the highest proportions by weight creating an emulsion that has dispersed phase as fat globules. The emulsion is turned into foam by incorporating air cells which are frozen to form dispersed ice cells. The triacylglycerols in fat are non polar and will adhere to themselves by Van der Waals interactions. Water is polar, thus emulsifiers are needed for dispersion of fat. Also ice cream has a colloidal phase of foam which helps in its light texture. Milk proteins such as casein and whey protein present in ice cream are amphiphilic, can adsorb water and form micelles which will contribute to its consistency. The proteins contribute to the emulsification, aeration and texture. Sucrose which is disaccharide is usually used as a sweetening agent. Lactose which is sugar present in milk will cause freezing point depression. Thus, on freezing some water will remain unfrozen and will not give a hard texture. Too much lactose will result in a non ideal texture because of either excessive freezing point depression or lactose crystallization.

Production 

Before the development of modern refrigeration, ice cream was a luxury reserved for special occasions. Making it was quite laborious; ice was cut from lakes and ponds during the winter and stored in holes in the ground, or in wood-frame or brick ice houses, insulated by straw. Many farmers and plantation owners, including U.S. Presidents George Washington and Thomas Jefferson, cut and stored ice in the winter for use in the summer. Frederic Tudor of Boston turned ice harvesting and shipping into a big business, cutting ice in New England and shipping it around the world.

Ice cream was made by hand in a large bowl placed inside a tub filled with ice and salt. This is called the pot-freezer method. In the pot-freezer method, the temperature of the ingredients is reduced by the mixture of crushed ice and salt. The salt water is cooled by the ice, and the action of the salt on the ice causes it to (partially) melt, absorbing latent heat and bringing the mixture below the freezing point of pure water. The immersed container can also make better thermal contact with the salty water and ice mixture than it could with ice alone.

The hand-cranked churn, which also uses ice and salt for cooling, replaced the pot-freezer method. The exact origin of the hand-cranked freezer is unknown, but the first U.S. patent for one was #3254 issued to Nancy Johnson on 9 September 1843. The hand-cranked churn produced smoother ice cream than the pot freezer and did it quicker. Many inventors patented improvements on Johnson's design.

In Europe and early America, ice cream was made and sold by small businesses, mostly confectioners and caterers. Jacob Fussell of Baltimore, Maryland was the first to manufacture ice cream on a large scale. Fussell bought fresh dairy products from farmers in York County, Pennsylvania, and sold them in Baltimore. An unstable demand for his dairy products often left him with a surplus of cream, which he made into ice cream. He built his first ice cream factory in Seven Valleys, Pennsylvania, in 1851. Two years later, he moved his factory to Baltimore. Later, he opened factories in several other cities and taught the business to others, who operated their own plants. Mass production reduced the cost of ice cream and added to its popularity.

The development of industrial refrigeration by German engineer Carl von Linde during the 1870s eliminated the need to cut and store natural ice, and, when the continuous-process freezer was perfected in 1926, commercial mass production of ice cream and the birth of the modern ice cream industry was underway.

In modern times, a common method for producing ice cream at home is to use an ice cream maker, an electrical device that churns the ice cream mixture while cooled inside a household freezer. Some more expensive models have an built-in freezing element. A newer method is to add liquid nitrogen to the mixture while stirring it using a spoon or spatula for a few seconds; a similar technique, advocated by Heston Blumenthal as ideal for home cooks, is to add dry ice to the mixture while stirring for a few minutes. Some ice cream recipes call for making a custard, folding in whipped cream, and immediately freezing the mixture. Another method is to use a pre-frozen solution of salt and water, which gradually melts as the ice cream freezes.

An unusual method of making ice cream was done during World War II by American fighter pilots based in the South Pacific. They attached pairs of  cans to their aircraft. The cans were fitted with a small propeller, this was spun by the slipstream and drove a stirrer, which agitated the mixture while the intense cold of high altitude froze it. B-17 crews in Europe did something similar on their bombing runs as did others.

Retail sales 

Ice cream can be mass-produced and thus is widely available in developed parts of the world. Ice cream can be purchased in large cartons (vats and squrounds) from supermarkets and grocery stores, in smaller quantities from ice cream shops, convenience stores, and milk bars, and in individual servings from small carts or vans at public events. In 2015, the US produced nearly 900 million gallons of ice cream.

Specialty job 

Today, jobs specialize in the selling of ice cream. The title of a person who works in this speciality is often called an 'ice cream man', however women also specialize in the selling of ice cream. People in this line of work often sell ice cream on beaches. On beaches, ice cream is either sold by a person who carries a box full of ice cream and is called over by people who want to purchase ice cream, or by a person who drives up to the top of the beach and rings a bell. In the second method, people go up to the top of the beach and purchase ice cream straight from the ice cream seller, who is often in an ice cream van. In Turkey and Australia, ice cream is sometimes sold to beach-goers from small powerboats equipped with chest freezers.

Some ice cream distributors sell ice cream products from travelling refrigerated vans or carts (commonly referred to in the US as "ice cream trucks"), sometimes equipped with speakers playing children's music or folk melodies (such as "Turkey in the Straw"). The driver of an ice cream van drives throughout neighbourhoods and stops every so often, usually every block. The seller on the ice cream van sells the ice cream through a large window; this window is also where the customer asks for ice cream and pays. Ice cream vans in the United Kingdom make a music box noise rather than actual music.

Ingredients and standard quality definitions 

Many countries have regulations controlling what can be described as ice cream.

In the U.S., the FDA rules state that to be described as "ice cream", a product must have the following composition:
 greater than 10% milk fat
 6 to 10% milk and non-fat milk solids: this component, also known as the milk solids-not-fat or serum solids, contains the proteins (caseins and whey proteins) and carbohydrates (lactose) found in milk

It generally also has:
 12 to 16% sweeteners: usually a combination of sucrose and glucose-based corn syrup sweeteners
 0.2 to 0.5% stabilizers and emulsifiers
 55 to 64% water, which comes from the milk or other ingredients.

These compositions are percentage by weight. Since ice cream can contain as much as half air by volume, these numbers may be reduced by as much as half if cited by volume. In terms of dietary considerations, the percentages by weight are more relevant.

According to the Canadian Food and Drugs Act and Regulations, ice cream in Canada is divided into  Ice cream mix and Ice cream. Each have a different set of regulations.
 Ice cream must be at least 10 percent milk fat, and must contain at least 180 grams of solids per litre. When cocoa, chocolate syrup, fruit, nuts, or confections are added, the percentage of milk fat can be 8 percent.
 The ice cream mix is defined as the pasteurized mix of cream, milk and other milk products that are not yet frozen. It may contain eggs, artificial or non-artificial flavours, cocoa or chocolate syrup, a food colour, an agent that adjusts the pH level in the mix, salt, a stabilizing agent that doesn't exceed 0.5% of the ice cream mix, a sequestering agent which preserves the food colour, edible casein that doesn't exceed 1% of the mix, propylene glycol mono fatty acids in an amount that will not exceed 0.35% of the ice cream mix, and sorbitan tristearate in an amount that will not exceed 0.035% of the mix. The ice cream mix may not include less than 36% solid components.

Physical properties 

Ice cream is considered a colloidal system. It is composed by ice cream crystals and aggregates, air that does not mix with the ice cream by forming small bubbles in the bulk and partially coalesced fat globules. This dispersed phase made from all the small particles is surrounded by an unfrozen continuous phase composed by sugars, proteins, salts, polysaccharides and water. Their interactions determine the properties of ice cream, whether soft and whippy or hard.

Ostwald ripening 

Ostwald ripening is the explanation for the growth of large crystals at the expense of small ones in the dispersion phase. This process is also called migratory recrystallization. It involves the formation of sharp crystals. Theories about Ostwald recrystallization admit that after a period of time, the recrystallization process can be described by the following equation:

Where r (0) is the initial size, n the order of recrystallization, and t a time constant for recrystallization that depends on the rate R (in units of size/time).

To make ice cream smooth, recrystallization must occur as slowly as possible, because small crystals create smoothness, meaning that r must decrease.

Food safety concerns 
From the perspective of food chemistry, ice cream is a colloid or foam. The dietary emulsifier plays an important role in ice cream. Soy lecithin and polysorbate are two popular emulsifiers used for ice cream production. A mouse study in 2015 shows that two commonly used dietary emulsifiers carboxymethylcellulose (CMC) and polysorbate 80 (P80) can potentially cause inflammatory bowel diseases, weight gain, and other metabolic syndromes.

Around the world 

Around the world, different cultures have developed unique versions of ice cream, suiting the product to local tastes and preferences.

The most traditional Argentine helado (ice cream) is very similar to Italian gelato, in large part due to the historical influence of Italian immigrants on Argentinian customs.

Per capita, Australians and New Zealanders are among the leading ice cream consumers in the world, eating 18 litres and 20 litres each per year respectively, behind the United States where people eat 23 litres each per year.

In China, besides the popular flavours such as vanilla, chocolate, coffee, mango and strawberry, many Chinese ice-cream manufacturers have also introduced other traditional Chinese flavours such as black sesame and red bean.

In Greece, ice cream in its modern form, or pagotó, was introduced in the beginning of the 20th century.

India is one of the largest producers of ice cream in the world, but most of its ice cream is consumed domestically. One of their most well-known ice creams is the kulfi available in both usual and local flavours like mango, rose, badam (almond), strawberry, kesar (saffron), pistachio, chocolate and can contain nuts, rose petals, saffron stalks, and pieces of other sweets like rabdri and gulab jamun.

Golas are summer treat consisting of shaved ice packed into a popsicle form on a stick and soaked in flavoured sugar syrup, a popular choice being kala khatta, made from the sweet and sour jamun fruit.

In Indonesia, a type of traditional ice cream called es puter or "stirred ice cream" is made from coconut milk, pandanus leaves, sugar—and flavors that include avocado, jackfruit, durian, palm sugar, chocolate, red bean, and mung bean.

In Iran, fālūdeh (Persian: فالوده) or pālūde (Persian: پالوده) is a Persian sorbet made of thin vermicelli noodles, frozen with sugar syrup and rose water. The dessert is often served with lime juice and sometimes ground pistachios.

Italian ice cream, or gelato as it is known, is a traditional and popular dessert in Italy. Much of the production is still hand-made and flavoured by each individual shop in "produzione propria" gelaterias. Gelato is made from whole milk, sugar, sometimes eggs, and natural flavourings. Gelato typically contains 7–8% fat, less than ice cream's minimum of 10%.

Sorbetes is a Philippine version of common ice cream usually peddled from carts by peddlers who roam streets in the Philippines. Despite the similarities between the name sorbetes and sorbet, sorbetes is not a type of sorbet.

In Spain, ice cream is often in the style of Italian gelato. Spanish helado can be found in many cafés or speciality ice cream stores. While many traditional flavours are sold, cafés may also sell flavours like nata, viola, crema catalana, or tiramisu. In the 1980s, the Spanish industry was known for creating many creative and weird ice cream bars.

Dondurma is the name given to ice cream in Turkey. Dondurma typically includes milk, sugar, salep, and mastic.

In the United Kingdom, 14 million adults buy ice cream as a treat, in a market worth £1.3 billion (according to a report produced in September 2009).

In the United States, ice cream made with just cream, sugar, and a flavouring (usually fruit) is sometimes referred to as "Philadelphia style" ice cream. Ice cream that uses eggs to make a custard is sometimes called "French ice cream". American federal labelling standards require ice cream to contain a minimum of 10% milk fat. Americans consume about 23 litres of ice cream per person per year—the most in the world. According to the NPD Group, the most popular ice cream flavours in the U.S. are vanilla and chocolate with a combined market share of 40% as of 2008.

In Syria there's the traditional ice cream called Booza. it's made of frozen dairy with mastic and sahlab (orchid flour), giving it its distinctive stretchy and chewy texture.

Cones 

Mrs A.B.Marshall's Cookery Book, published in 1888, endorsed serving ice cream in cones. Agnes Marshall was a celebrated cookery writer of her day and helped to popularize ice cream. She patented and manufactured an ice cream maker and was the first to suggest using liquefied gases to freeze ice cream after seeing a demonstration at the Royal Institution.

Reliable evidence proves that ice cream cones were served in the 19th century, and their popularity increased greatly during the St. Louis World's Fair in 1904. According to legend, an ice cream vendor at the fair ran out of cardboard dishes. The vendor at the Syrian waffle booth next door, unsuccessful in the intense heat, offered to make cones by rolling up his waffles. The new product sold well and was widely copied by other vendors.

Cryogenics 

In 2006, some commercial ice cream makers began to use liquid nitrogen in the primary freezing of ice cream, thus eliminating the need for a conventional ice cream freezer. The preparation results in a column of white condensed water vapour cloud. The ice cream, dangerous to eat while still "steaming" with liquid nitrogen, is allowed to rest until the liquid nitrogen is completely vaporized. Sometimes ice cream is frozen to the sides of the container, and must be allowed to thaw. Good results can also be achieved with the more readily available dry ice, and authors such as Heston Blumenthal have published recipes to produce ice cream and sorbet using a simple blender.

See also 

 Cold-stimulus headache
 Ice cream social
 List of dairy products
 List of desserts
 List of ice cream brands
 List of ice cream flavors
 Milkshake (a blended mix of ice cream, milk and syrups)
 Nancy Maria Donaldson Johnson
 Soft serve

References

External links 

 How It's Made: UConn Dairy Bar Ice Cream
 Selected Internet Resources – Ice Cream / Science Reference Section, Library of Congress

 
Dairy products
Types of food
Frozen desserts
World cuisine
Independence Day (United States) foods